Zafar Yuldoshevich Babajanow (born 9 February 1987) is a Turkmen professional footballer currently playing for FC Altyn Asyr and Turkmenistan national football team.

Club career
At 2013–2014 season played for Turkish Kartalspor at TFF First League, 7 games.

From 2014 play for Ahal FK in Ýokary Liga. Since 2016 plays for FC Altyn Asyr.

Career statistics

International

Statistics accurate as of match played 9 June 2021

Scores and results list Turkmenistan's goal tally first.

References

External links
 

1987 births
Living people
Turkmenistan footballers
Turkmenistan expatriate footballers
Turkmenistan international footballers
Association football defenders
Expatriate footballers in Turkey
Turkmenistan expatriate sportspeople in Turkey
People from Daşoguz
FC Ahal players
FC Altyn Asyr players
2019 AFC Asian Cup players